Kazimierz Piotr Adach (born 9 May 1957 in Ustka) is a retired boxer from Poland, who won the bronze medal in the lightweight division (– 60 kg) at the 1980 Summer Olympics in Moscow, Soviet Union. In the semifinals he was beaten by eventual gold medalist Ángel Herrera of Cuba.

1980 Olympic results 
Below are the results of Kazimierz Adach, a lightweight boxer from Poland who competed at the 1980 Olympics in Moscow:

 Round of 32: Defeated Bounphisith Songkhamphou (Laos) referee stopped contest in second round
 Round of 16: Defeated Omari Golaya (Tanzania) by decision, 5-0
 Quarterfinal: Defeated Florian Livadaru (Romania) referee stopped contest in third round
 Semifinal: Lost to Ángel Herrera (Cuba) by decision, 0-5 (was awarded bronze medal)

References

External links 
 
 
 
 

1957 births
Living people
Polish male boxers
Light-heavyweight boxers
Olympic boxers of Poland
Olympic bronze medalists for Poland
Olympic medalists in boxing
Boxers at the 1980 Summer Olympics
Medalists at the 1980 Summer Olympics
People from Słupsk County
Sportspeople from Pomeranian Voivodeship